Annulatin is an O-methylated flavonol found in the roots of Pteroxygonum giraldii.

References 

O-methylated flavonols